Bo Taya (born as  Khin Maung Oo, 13 April 1919 in Pyinman) was a Burmese writer, military officer and a member of the Thirty Comrades. He served in the Burmese National Army (BIA) and Burmese Defense Force and participated in the Japanese Revolution.

Biography and Career 
On 13 April 1919, he was born in Pyinmana. His birth name was Khin Maung Oo.

1936, he joined the Pyinmana District's Dobama Asiayone and was actively involved in the District Federation of Student Unions, District Burial Armed Forces and in the establishment of the Farmers' Union within the district.

From 1942 to 1945, he joined the Burmese National Army (BIA) and Burmese Defence Force and participated in the Japanese Revolution.

1959 he married Daw Saw Khin. In the 1960 Burmese general election, he was elected as a Pyithu Hluttaw MP. In 1961, he received a literature award for his novel Thirty Comrades's Back of Home.

Published books

Mi Pann Ma (မိပန်းမ, Woman) 1957
Maw Taw Yayyin (မေတ္တာရေယာဉ်, Merchant Boat) 1959
Mike Thamya Dan (မိုက်သမျှဒဏ်, A Fool's Fool) 1960
Chit Thamya Ko (ချစ်သမျှကို, Love All) 1961
Mone Chit Thanar ( မုန်းချစ်သနား) 1961
Moe and Myae (မိုးနှင့်မ, Rain and Ground) 1961

Death
Bo Taya died in Yangon on February 6, 1993.

References

Burmese military personnel
20th-century Burmese businesspeople
Government ministers of Myanmar
Burmese collaborators with Imperial Japan
1910s births
1993 deaths
People from Yangon Region